Lasse Heikkilä (born May 27, 1934) is a retired professional ice hockey player and coach who played in the SM-liiga.

Heikkila played for Karhut and Ässät.  He was later inducted into the Finnish Hockey Hall of Fame.

Liitsola coached the national team of Finland in 1976–1977.

External links
 Finnish Hockey Hall of Fame bio

1934 births
Living people
Ässät players
Finland men's national ice hockey team coaches
Finnish ice hockey coaches
Finnish ice hockey defencemen
Karhut Pori players
Sportspeople from Pori
Ässät coaches